Honor Thy Mother is a 1992 American television film directed by David Greene and written by Richard DeLong Adams and Robert L. Freedman, based on the non-fiction book Blood Games by Jerry Bledsoe. The true crime story recounts the murder of Lieth Von Stein, and stars Sharon Gless, Brian Wimmer, and William McNamara. The film was considered a ratings hit.

References

1990s English-language films
1992 television films
American films based on actual events
CBS network films
Crime films based on actual events
Films based on non-fiction books